

Events
Lanfranc Cigala writes  bemoaning the state of the Church
 Japanese Retired Emperor Go-Saga orders a new imperial anthology of waka poems; compiled by Fujiwara no Tameie, the new anthology, titled Shokugosen Wakashū' 続後撰和歌集 ("Later Collection Continued"), would be finished three years later, in 1251

Births

Deaths
 Shams Tabrizi (born 1185), Persian Sufi

See also
 13th century in poetry
 List of years in poetry

13th-century poetry
Poetry